Soong Tse-vung, more commonly romanized as Soong Tse-ven or Soong Tzu-wen (4 December 1894 – 25 April 1971), was a prominent businessman and politician in the early 20th-century Republic of China, who served as Premier. His father was Charlie Soong and his siblings were the Soong sisters. His Christian name was Paul, but he is generally known in English as T. V. Soong.

Early life and education

Born in Shanghai International Concession, T. V. Soong received his education at St. John's University in Shanghai before he completed a bachelor's degree in economics from Harvard University in 1915. He worked at the International Banking Corporation in New York while pursuing graduate studies at Columbia University. His sisters, known collectively as the Soong Sisters, married well: one married a Yale man from a leading family of Chinese bankers who would eventually become Premier of the Republic of China, H. H. Kung; another became the wife of Sun Yat-sen, founder and leader of the Chinese nationalist independence movement; and yet another became the world-famous wife of Chiang Kai-shek known colloquially as Madame Chiang.

Career

Upon returning to China he worked for several industrial enterprises, and was then recruited by Sun Yat-sen to develop finances for his Canton government. After the success of Chiang Kai-shek's Northern Expedition in 1927, Soong served in a succession of offices in the Nationalist Government, including governor of the Central Bank of China (1928–1934) and minister of finance (1928–1933).

He founded the China Development Finance Corporation (CDFC) in 1934, along with other prominent financial figures, such as Chang Kia-ngau, Chen Guangpu and H.H. Kung. CDFC provided China's chief access to foreign investment for the next decade. In the summer of 1940, Chiang appointed Soong to Washington, D.C., as his personal representative. His task was to win support for China's war with Japan. Soong successfully negotiated substantial loans for this purpose. Also, while he was in Washington in 1940, Soonghad  managed to prevail upon President Roosevelt and his administration to back the plan of then-retired U.S. Col. Claire Lee Chennault to firebomb Japanese cities with Lockheed Hudson bombers painted with Chinese Air Force markings and flown by American pilots from airbases in China before the Japanese attack on Pearl Harbor. A scant month before the Pearl Harbor attack, the plan was scotched by U.S. Army Chief of Staff General George C. Marshall. After Pearl Harbor, Chiang appointed Soong Minister of Foreign Affairs, though Soong remained in Washington to manage the alliance with both the U.S. and the U.K.

During his tenure as Finance Minister, he managed to balance China's budget, which was no small accomplishment. He resigned in 1933, displeased with Chiang Kai-shek's appeasement of Japan and attempts to placate Japanese aggression. He later returned to service as Minister of Foreign Affairs (1942–1945), and as President of the Executive Yuan (1945–1947). Soong left his legacy as head of the Chinese delegation to the United Nations Conference on International Organization in San Francisco, April 1945, which later became the United Nations.

Soong was in charge of negotiating with the Soviet leader Joseph Stalin regarding Soviet interests in China, and travelled to Moscow to extract from Stalin a guarantee to oppose the Chinese Communist Party. Soong conceded to Stalin the Manchurian railways and Korean independence but refused to allow Soviet interference in Xinjiang or military bases in Manchuria. He also indicated that China and the Soviet Union could share dominion over Mongolia if a "mutual assistance pact" was agreed to. Soong was known for his tough negotiating style with Stalin in getting straight to the point and freely using the threat of American military backing to strengthen his demands. When the Sino-Soviet treaty was signed, China ceded to the Soviets parts of Mongolia, the use of a naval base at Port Arthur (with civilian rule remaining Chinese), and co-ownership of the Chinese Eastern Railway in Manchuria.

In return, Soong extracted from Stalin recognition of the Republic of China as the legitimate regime of China, aid from the Soviets, and an oral agreement to an eventual Soviet withdrawal from Manchuria. The treaty failed to end tension in China with the communists, which resulted in renewed fighting in the Chinese Civil War. Stalin had previously told the Americans that President Roosevelt should inform Chiang Kai-shek of the Russian demands in Manchuria, at the Yalta Conference, before Stalin informed Soong.

During the war years, he financed the "Flying Tigers"—the American mercenary group that was later incorporated into the United States Air Force. Gen. Claire Chennault was listed as an employee of the Bank of China. On this project Soong worked very closely with his sister, Madame Chiang Kai-shek (May-ling Soong). He once remarked to John Paton Davies, Jr., one of the China Hands, that there were no U.S. State Department memos sent from China to which he did not have access within a few days.

Death
After the defeat of the Nationalists in the Chinese Civil War, Soong moved to New York and remained an influential member of the China Lobby.  On 25 April 1971, Soong choked to death in San Francisco at a dinner party hosted by the chairman of the San Francisco branch of the Bank of Canton, when a piece of chicken lodged in his windpipe. Soong was survived by his widow,  (張樂怡; Chang¹ Lê⁴-I²; Zhāng Lèyí), who had taken on the English name of Laura Chang Soong.

See also

 History of the Republic of China

References

Sources

External links

T.V. Soong Papers at the Hoover Institution Archives
 

1891 births
1971 deaths
Bank of China people
Burials at Ferncliff Cemetery
Chinese Methodists
Chinese people of World War II
Columbia University alumni
Foreign Ministers of the Republic of China
Harvard University alumni
Republic of China politicians from Shanghai
Premiers of the Republic of China
Finance Ministers of the Republic of China
St. John's University, Shanghai alumni
Governors of the Central Bank of the Republic of China
Chinese anti-communists